Earl Cave (born 23 June 2000) is an English actor. He is known for his film roles in Days of the Bagnold Summer and True History of the Kelly Gang.

Early life and education
Cave was born in London to Australian singer Nick Cave and English actress and designer Susie Bick. He grew up in Brighton, East Sussex along with his twin brother Arthur. He also has a half-brother Luke. He attended Bede's Senior School where he participated in theatre. His twin brother Arthur died in a cliffside accident on 14 July 2015, aged 15. His half-brother Jethro Lazenby died on 9 May 2022, aged 31.

Filmography

Film

Television

References

External links

2000 births
21st-century English male actors
English male film actors
English people of Australian descent
Male actors from Brighton
Male actors from London
People educated at Lancing College
People educated at St Bede's School, Hailsham
People from the City of Westminster
Living people